Fabray is a surname. Notable people with the surname include:

 Nanette Fabray (1920-2018), American actress, comedian, singer, dancer, and activist
 Quinn Fabray, a fictional character from the musical comedy-drama TV series Glee

See also
 Fabry